Buckhorn Creek is a stream in the U.S. state of Ohio.

Buckhorn Creek was so named on account of its irregular shape.

See also
List of rivers of Ohio

References

Rivers of Coshocton County, Ohio
Rivers of Tuscarawas County, Ohio
Rivers of Ohio